Don Pilkenton is a car customizer based in Ohio, United States. He has built three cars to win the Ridler Award, in 1993, 1996 and 1999. He was the first builder to win the award three times.

The 1993 winner was a 1940 Ford coupé built for Dave Stitzer.

George Poteet's 1937 Ford roadster was the 1996 winner. This car went on to take "America's Most Beautiful Roadster", top prize at the Oakland Roadster Show. 

In 1999, Pilkenton built a winning 3-window Deuce for Bob Young.

In 2007, Pilkenton's custom shop closed.

References

External links 
Mac's Motor City Garage (list of past Ridler Award winners)
Classicarnews.com(list of past Ridler Award winners)
Racingjunk.com (1993 Ridler winner details)
Collector Car Nation online (1993 Ridler winner details)

Kustom Kulture artists
American automobile designers
Vehicle modification people
Businesspeople from Ohio
20th-century American businesspeople
21st-century American businesspeople
Living people
Year of birth missing (living people)